Despoja is a surname. Notable people with the surname include: 

Mario Despoja, Croatian Australian
Natasha Stott Despoja (born 1969), Australian politician, diplomat, advocate, and author
Shirley Stott Despoja (born 1936), Australian journalist